Horomos, also known as Horomosivank or Ghoshavank, is an abandoned and ruined medieval Armenian monastic complex about 15 kilometers northeast of the ruins of Ani (the capital of Bagratid Armenia)
in present-day eastern Turkey. With its collection of churches, chapels and tombs, Horomos has been described as one of the most significant spiritual and cultural religious centers in medieval Armenia and one of the largest in all the Christian East.

Horomos was founded by a group of Armenian monks around 931-36, during the reign of King Abas I Bagratuni (r. ca. 929-953). The monastic complex was enlarged over time and came to include the individual churches of Sts. John, Minas, and George, a series of large halls (gavits), a triumphal arch, and various smaller chapels and mausolea. The monastery continued to function after the fall of Ani, but appears to have been temporary abandoned in the early 17th century and then reoccupied and repaired in 1685. It continued to operate as a monastery until it was finally abandoned due to the Armenian Genocide.

Some time after 1965, the Monastery of Horomos was partly destroyed, most likely as part of the Turkish government's policy of cultural genocide. A tomb believed to belong to King Ashot III (953-977) which had survived at least up to 1920 is now nowhere to be found. Some buildings have entirely vanished, and most of the surviving walls have been stripped of their facing masonry. The dome of the Church of the St. John collapsed in the 1970s. The site lies next to the Armenian border and gaining permission to visit the monastery is all but impossible.

Old photos

Actual state

References

Further reading 
 Kazaryan, Armen. The Zhamatun of Horomos: The Shaping of an Unprecedented Type of Fore-church Hall, in: kunsttexte.de, Nr. 3, 2014
  Baladian, Ani and Jean Michel Thierry (eds.) with a contribution by J. P. Mahé (2002), Le couvent de Horomos d'après les archives de Toros Toramanian. Paris: Académie des inscriptions et belles-lettres.
 Manuk-Khaloyan, Armen (2013), "In the Cemetery of their Ancestors: The Royal Burial Tombs of the Bagratuni Kings of Greater Armenia (890-1073/79)", Revue des Études Arméniennes 35, pp. 131–202.
 Sinclair, Thomas A. (1987). Eastern Turkey: An Architectural and Archaeological Survey. London: Pindar Press, vol. 1.
  Thierry, Jean Michel (1980). Le couvent armenien d'Horomos. Leuven: Peeters.

External links 
 The Monastery of Horomos at VirtualAni.org
 About Horomos Monastery

Armenian churches in Turkey
Oriental Orthodox congregations established in the 10th century
Christian monasteries established in the 10th century
Destroyed churches in Turkey
Demolished buildings and structures in Turkey
Churches destroyed by Muslims
Armenian buildings in Turkey